Myllypuro metro station (- "Mill Creek") is a ground-level station on lines M2 (Tapiola - Mellunmäki) and M2M (Matinkylä - Mellunmäki)  of the Helsinki Metro. There are 97 bicycle and 40 car parking spaces at Myllypuro. The station serves the quarter of Myllypuro in East Helsinki.

The station was opened on 21 October 1986 and was designed by the architect firm Toivo Karhunen Oy. It is located 1.9 kilometers north of Itäkeskus and 1.4 kilometers south of Kontula.

One of Metropolia's campuses is located in Myllypuro, which is why the idea of changing the station's name from Myllypuro to Metropolia has also been brought up.

Pictures

References

External links

Helsinki Metro stations
Railway stations opened in 1986
1986 establishments in Finland